Karl Blossfeldt (June 13, 1865December 9, 1932) was a German photographer and sculptor. He is best known for his close-up photographs of plants and living things, published in 1929 as Urformen der Kunst. He was inspired, as was his father, by nature and the ways in which plants grow. He believed that "the plant must be valued as a totally artistic and architectural structure."

Among his contacts at the Berlin Arts and Crafts School was Heinz Warneke. From 1923, he was professor at the Vereinigte Staatsschulen für Freie und Angewandte Kunst (United State Schools for Fine and Applied Art) in Berlin, Germany. He died aged 67.

Biography 

Blossfeldt never received formal training on the subject of photography but apprenticed in Rome under Moritz Meurer, (1839–1916), a decorative artist and professor of ornament and design, from 1890 to 1896. Appointed for a teaching post at the Institute of Royal Arts Museum in 1898 (where he remained until 1931), he established an archive for his photographs.

Blossfeldt developed a series of home-made cameras that allowed him to photograph plant surfaces in unprecedented, magnified detail. This reflected his enduring interest in the repetitive patterns found in nature's textures and forms.

Karl Blossfeldt worked in Berlin, Germany

Life and legacy 
In Berlin from the late nineteenth century until his death, Blossfeldt's works were primarily used as teaching tools and were brought to public attention in 1929 by his first publication Urformen der Kunst (Art Forms in Nature). Published in 1929 when Blossfeldt was 63 and a professor of applied art at the Vereinigte Staatsschulen für freie und angewandte Kunst, Urformen der Kunst quickly became an international bestseller and in turn, made Blossfeldt famous almost overnight. The abstract shapes and structures in nature that he revealed impressed his contemporaries. Swiftly regarded as a seminal book on photography, Blossfeldt's objective and finely detailed imagery was praised by Walter Benjamin, who declared that Blossfeldt "has played his part in that great examination of the inventory of perception, which will have an unforeseeable effect on our conception of the world". He compared him to Moholy-Nagy and the pioneers of New Objectivity, and ranked his achievements alongside the great photographers August Sander and Eugène Atget. The Surrealists also championed him, and Georges Bataille included his images in the periodical Documents in 1929.

The publication of his working collages in 2001 threw into question the legitimacy of his association with New Objectivity, as his methods were shown to differ from those of other artists in the movement.

In 2001 Urformen der Kunst was included in "The Book of 101 Books" as one of the seminal photographic books of the twentieth century.

See also 
 Wilson "Snowflake" Bentley

References

External links 

 Website Karl-Blossfeldt-Archiv 
 The Portfolio 
 Blossfeldt's Urformen der Kunst
 Masters of Photography article
 Fine Rare Prints Antique Prints

1865 births
1932 deaths
Botanical illustrators
Modern sculptors
19th-century German photographers
19th-century German sculptors
19th-century German male artists
German male sculptors
20th-century German sculptors
20th-century German male artists
Photographers from Berlin